Steven Odendaal (born 2 March 1993) is a motorcycle racer from South Africa and the 2016 FIM CEV Moto2 European Champion.

Career

Odendaal won the South African national Super600 Championship in 2014 and 2015. In the European FIM CEV Repsol Championship he finished 5th in 2014 and 4th in 2015 before claiming the title in 2016 (with 6 victories and 9 podium finishes in 11 races) in Portimão, Portugal, two rounds ahead of the season's final.

In 2017 he joined the Project NTS with a brand new chassis to challenge for the European title again. He finished in 3rd position overall in the European Moto2 Championship, claiming his third South African 600cc national title as well, despite missing four races due to his international commitments. In 2018–2019 Odendaal competed in the Moto2 World Championship aboard the NTS chassis (full time debut season for the manufacturer) before making a switch to the Supersport World Championship in 2020, where he finished 5th overall in his debut season.

For 2021 Odendaal joined the Evan Bros. Yamaha team in World Supersport, winning the first three opening races of the season.

Career statistics

FIM CEV Moto2 European Championship

By season

Races by year
(key) (Races in bold indicate pole position, races in italics indicate fastest lap)

Grand Prix motorcycle racing

By season

Races by year
(key) (Races in bold indicate pole position, races in italics indicate fastest lap)

Supersport World Championship

Races by year
(key) (Races in bold indicate pole position; races in italics indicate fastest lap)

External links

 
 

South African motorcycle racers
Living people
1993 births
Moto2 World Championship riders
Sportspeople from Johannesburg
Supersport World Championship riders